Min or MIN may refer to:

Places 
 Fujian, also called Mǐn, a province of China
 Min Kingdom (909–945), a state in Fujian
 Min County, a county of Dingxi, Gansu province, China
 Min River (Fujian)
 Min River (Sichuan)
 Mineola (Amtrak station), station code MIN

People

Personal names
 Min (Korean name), Korean surname and given names
 Min (surname) (闵/閔), a Chinese surname

Individuals with the name
 Min (Vietnamese singer) (born 1988)
 Min (Korean singer) (born 1991), South Korean singer, songwriter and actress Lee Min-young
 Min (treasurer), ancient Egyptian official
 Min, Marquis of Jin (died 678 BC), Chinese monarch
 Empress Myeongseong (1851–1895), informally Queen Min, empress of Joseon
 Menes or Min (a spelling variant no longer accepted), an early Egyptian pharaoh
 Min Hogg (born 1939), British journalist and magazine editor
 Min, a character from Barney & Friends played by Pia Hamilton from 1992 to 1995
 Min Hael Cassidy, a character from the 2021 animated TV series Dino Ranch

Groups of people
 Min Chinese speakers, a subgroup of Chinese peoples who speak Min Chinese
 Mountain Ok people or Min peoples, West Sepik Province of Papua New Guinea

Computing and technology
 Mobile identification number
 Multistage interconnection networks, a class of high-speed computer networks

Languages
 Min Chinese, a category of spoken Chinese
 Minangkabau language, ISO 639-2 code min, an Austronesian language, spoken by the Minangkabau of West Sumatra

Measures
 Minimum, abbreviated min.
 Minute, abbreviated min., a unit of time
 Minute of arc, abbreviated min., a unit of angular measurement

Other uses 
 Min (god), Egyptian god of reproduction
 Min (ship), replica of an Ancient Egyptian ship
 Mašinska Industrija Niš, or MIN, a Serbian company
 Min Farshaw, a character in the Wheel of Time fantasy series
 Minneapolis’s major professional sports teams
 Minnesota Vikings of the National Football League
 Minnesota Timberwolves of the National Basketball Association
 Minnesota Wild of the National Hockey League
 Minnesota Twins of Major League Baseball
 Minister (government), commonly abbreviated Min.
 Minuth or Min, a type of heresy in Judaism
 Mortgage identification number, an identifier created by Mortgage Electronic Registration Systems